Imbricaria baisei is a species of sea snail, a marine gastropod mollusk in the family Mitridae, the miters or miter snails.

Original Description
      (of Subcancilla baisei Poppe, Tagaro & Salisbury, 2009) Poppe G.T., Tagaro S. & Salisbury R. (2009) New species of Mitridae and Costellariidae from the Philippines. Visaya Suppl. 4: 1-86.

Description

Distribution

References

Mitridae
Gastropods described in 2009